USS Leyden has been the name of more than one United States Navy ship, and may refer to:

, an armed tug in commission from 1866 to 1903
, a naval auxiliary in commission from 1944 to 1945

United States Navy ship names